The Bani River is the principal tributary of the Niger River in Mali.

Geography
The Bani River has three main tributaries: the Baoulé that rises near Odienné in Côte d'Ivoire and passes just south of Bougouni, the Bagoé River that rises near Boundiali in Côte d'Ivoire and the Banifing-Lotio that drains the region around Sikasso.

The annual rainfall varies across the catchment basin with the southern area in Côte d'Ivoire receiving  a year while the northern area around Douna receiving only . The rainfall is seasonal with most of the rain falling between May and October. The maximum rainfall occurs in August.

The discharge of the Bani River is also highly seasonal, with the maximum flow occurring at the end of September and very little flow between
February and June. The river enters the Inland Niger Delta north of San and after the annual rains the river floods (the French word crue is sometimes used) and covers the floodplain.

There is a significant inter-annual variation in the rainfall and, as a consequence, in the quantity of water flowing in the river. The drought that started at the beginning of the 1970s led to a very large reduction in the flow and up to the present time the volumes are still much lower than those observed in the 1950s and 1960s. The reduction in the flow of the river was much greater than the reduction in the rainfall. The average rainfall for 1981-1989 was 20% less than for 1961-1970 while the discharge of the river was reduced by 75%. The effect of the reduced rainfall was less extreme for other tributaries of the Niger. Over the same period the catchment basin of the Upper Niger suffered a similar 20% reduction in rainfall but the readings at the Koulikoro gauge station were only reduced to 50% of the earlier values. Because of the accumulated groundwater deficit, even in a year with high rainfall, the discharge of the Bani River is less than in the wet decades of the 1950s and 1960s.

Talo Dam
In 2006 the Talo Dam was constructed to irrigate parts of the floodplain to the south of the river near the town of San. Prior to the construction of the dam, these areas were only fully flooded in very wet years, the most recent of which occurred in 1967. The dam acts as a weir in that water can flow over the top of the retaining wall. The construction of the dam was highly controversial. The environmental impact assessment commissioned by the African Development Bank was criticised for not fully taking into account the hydrological impact downstream of the dam.

A downstream flow of /s can be maintained during the dry season by opening a sluice gate. From the published information it is unclear how much of the total discharge will be diverted for irrigation and, of the diverted water, how much will drain back into the river. The downstream effect of the dam will be to delay the arrival of the annual flood and to reduce its intensity.

Djenné Dam
The dam is one element in a 6-year 66 million USD program that also includes the building of a dam on the Sankarani River near Kourouba and the extension of the area irrigated by the Talo dam. The proposed Djenné dam will retain  of water, significantly more than the Talo dam. It will allow the "controlled flooding" of 14,000 ha of the Pondori floodplain (on the left bank of the river to the south of Djenné) to allow the cultivation of rice and the irrigation of an additional 5000 ha for growing 'floating grass' (Echinochloa stagnina know locally as bourgou) for animal feed.

The effects of the dams on the flooding of the Inland Niger Delta downstream of Mopti are expected to be modest, as the discharge of the Bani is only one third of that of the Niger: for the period 1952-2002 the average flow at Douna was /s compared with /s for the Niger at Koulikoro.

Notes

References
.
. Pages 30–31 contain a table dated 2003 prepared by J.R. Patenaude, giving values for the water flow in an average year (assumed to be 125 m3/s or 3.9 km3/y).
.
.
.
. Also published in French with the title  "Le Niger: une Artère vitale. Gestion efficace de l’eau dans le bassin du Haut Niger".

External links
Photographs of the Bani River at Douna.
.

 
Rivers of Mali
Tributaries of the Niger River